Lake Griffin State Park is a Florida State Park located two miles (3 km) north of Leesburg, in Fruitland Park and  south of Ocala on U.S. Highway 441.  It is home to one of the state's largest live oak trees. The park is unique in connecting to Lake Griffin, the Ocklawaha River and thence to the Harris Chain of Lakes, and is made up of 577.63 acres (2.33758 km2) of swampland and hardwood upland.

Activities include boating and canoeing, kayaking, hiking, fishing, camping, and wildlife viewing. Among the wildlife of the park are osprey, bald eagle, blue heron, anhinga, ibis, American alligator, and river otter.

Amenities include a full-facility campground, a half-mile nature trail, a boat ramp that provides access to the Dead River, and a playground for small children as well as kayak and canoe rentals,  a forty site campground, and a picnic area. The park is open from 8:00 am until sundown year-round.

External links
 Lake Griffin State Park at Florida State Parks
 Lake Griffin State Park at State Parks
 Lake Griffin State Park at Absolutely Florida
 Lake Griffin State Park at Wildernet

Parks in Lake County, Florida
State parks of Florida